Cottonwood River is one of the principal tributaries of the Neosho River in central Kansas of the United States.

Course
The river begins near the west line of Marion County as two tributaries, the North Cottonwood River and the South Cottonwood River.  They both start within 2 miles of each other, and within a few miles northwest of Lehigh.

The North Cottonwood starts near the west line of Marion County, crosses into McPherson County and roughly parallels the county line northward for 5 miles, then crosses back into Marion County. It flows through Durham then into the Marion Reservoir.

The South Cottonwood also starts near the west line of Marion County, flows southward about 1 mile west of Lehigh, then flows eastward about 2 miles south of Hillsboro, then northeast towards the lower side of the Marion Reservoir.

The North and South Cottonwood join about 1 mile southeast of the Marion Reservoir to become the North Fork Cottonwood River, before flowing through the city of Marion. The river flows southeast to Florence, then eastward towards Chase County. In Chase County, it flows northeast through Cedar Point then near Clements and Elmdale. It then flows eastward through Strong City, Cottonwood Falls.

The South Fork Cottonwood River starts south of Matfield Green, then flows northward along the east side of Matfield Green and Bazaar. It merges with the North Fork Cottonwood River about 3 miles east of Cottonwood Falls then flows eastward near Saffordville and across into Lyon County near Plymouth, Kansas, then along the south edge of Emporia. It flows into the Neosho River about 5 miles east of Emporia.

History
In 1806, Zebulon Pike led the Pike Expedition westward from St Louis, Missouri, of which part of their journey followed the Cottonwood River through Marion County near the current towns of Florence, Marion, Durham.

Cities and towns along the river
 Marion
 Florence
 Cedar Point
 Clements
 Elmdale
 Strong City
 Cottonwood Falls
 Saffordville
 Emporia

Tributaries
 Cedar Creek
 Diamond Creek
 Doyle Creek
 Jacobs Creek

Lakes
The following lakes are located in the Cottonwood River drainage basin:
 Marion Reservoir, northwest of Marion.
 Marion County Lake, southeast of Marion.
 Chase County State Lake, west of Cottonwood Falls.
 Camp Wood YMCA Lake, south of Elmdale.
 Peabody Country Club Lake, south of Peabody.

Bridges
The following bridges over the Cottonwood River are on the National Register of Historic Places list:
 1916 Cottonwood River Pratt Truss Bridge, 0.8 miles west of Cedar Point.
 1886 Clements Stone Arch Bridge, 0.5 miles southeast of Clements.
 1914 Cottonwood River Bridge, north edge of Cottonwood Falls.
 1923 Soden's Grove Bridge, south edge of Emporia.

Gallery

See also
 Cedar Point Mill
 Jacobs Creek and Jacobs Creek Flood
 Great Flood of 1951
 List of Kansas rivers

References

External links

Cottonwood River current depth and history
 west edge of Marion
 1 mile east of Florence
 1 mile southwest of Plymouth (between Strong City and Emporia)
 4 miles east of Emporia

Rivers of Kansas
Rivers of McPherson County, Kansas
Rivers of Marion County, Kansas
Rivers of Chase County, Kansas
Rivers of Lyon County, Kansas